The Boxing Tournament at the 2005 Mediterranean Games was held in the Los Ángeles Sports Hall in Almería, Spain from June 27 to July 2.

Medal winners

Medal table

References
2005 Mediterranean Games report at the International Committee of Mediterranean Games (CIJM) website
2005 Mediterranean Games boxing tournament at Amateur Boxing Results

Mediterranean
Sports at the 2005 Mediterranean Games
2005